Princess Meng was a princess of the Xiongnu-led Chinese Northern Liang dynasty. Her husband was Juqu Mengxun (Prince Wuxuan).

Very little is known about Princess Meng. She was mentioned as Juqu Mengxun's wife in 413, when she thwarted an assassination attempt against him by the eunuch Wang Huaizu (王懷祖) and captured Wang. She was probably the mother of his first two heirs apparent Juqu Xingguo (沮渠興國) and Juqu Puti (沮渠菩提), although this is not completely clear. It appears unlikely that she was the mother of his actual successor Juqu Mujian.  

During Juqu Mujian's reign, a princess dowager was mentioned, without any names, and it could have been Princess Meng or Juqu Mujian's birth mother. If it was Princess Meng, then she died in the Northern Wei capital Pingcheng (平城, in modern Datong, Shanxi) after Juqu Mujian's capital Guzang (姑臧, in modern Wuwei, Gansu) had fallen to Northern Wei forces and he had been taken captive, but she was still buried with honors due a princess.

References 

|- style="text-align: center;"

|-

|-

|- style="text-align: center;"

Northern Liang princesses
5th-century deaths
Year of birth unknown
5th-century Chinese people
5th-century Chinese women